The highland midge (scientific name: Culicoides impunctatus;) is a species of small flying insect, found across the Palearctic (throughout the British Isles, Scandinavia, other regions of Northern Europe, Russia and Northern China) in upland and lowland areas (fens, bogs and marshes). In the north west of Scotland, and down the Western coast to north Wales, the highland midge is usually very prevalent from late spring to late summer. Female highland midges are well known for gathering in clouds and biting humans, though the majority of the blood they obtain comes from cattle, sheep and deer. The bite of Culicoides is felt as a sharp prick. It is often followed by irritating lumps that may disappear in a few hours or last for days, depending on the individual.

Following Scotland's exceptionally cold winter in the early part of 2010, scientists found that the prolonged freezing conditions, rather than reducing the following summer's midge population in the Scottish Highlands, in fact increased it as the cold weather had reduced the numbers of its natural predators, such as bats and birds.

Activity
Female midges tend to bite close to their breeding site (although they have been found up to 1 km away) and near to the ground. They are most active just before dawn and sunset but bite at any time of day.

Dry cloudless conditions are unfavourable to midges, thus they are prevalent in humid, wet and cloudy conditions. Rain does not deter them, nor does darkness. However, they tend not to go into houses or buildings, but will enter tents.

Prevention 
Midge bites may be prevented by wearing clothes to minimise exposed skin and using a midge net to cover the head.

Insect repellents such  as DEET may be used. Queen Victoria was attacked by midges when in the Highlands and permitted smoking at Balmoral Castle to deter them.

References

Further reading
 Hendry, George. Midges in Scotland 4th Edition, Mercat Press, Edinburgh, 2003

External links
 APS Midge Forecast Interactive midge forecast for Scotland
 Institute of Animal Health Culicoides impunctatus
 Down Garden Services – Midge

Insects described in 1920
Culicoides
Nematoceran flies of Europe
Aquatic insects